HSwMS Sjöormen (Sor), Sw. meaning sea serpent,  was the lead ship of the Swedish submarine class Sjöormen, project name A11.

Development 
The planning of the class included a number of different AIP solutions including nuclear propulsion. However, the ships where finally completed with for the time extremely large batteries. The ship was a single-hulled submarine, with hull shape influenced by the American experimental submarine . The hull was covered with rubber tiles to reduce the acoustic signature (anechoic tiles), at this time a pioneering technology. The  also pioneered the use of an x-shaped (as opposed to cross-shaped) rudder as a standard (as opposed to experimental) feature.

Service in Sweden 
The submarine served in the Swedish Navy for almost 30 years and was then sold to Singapore in 1997 together with its four sister ships.

Service in Singapore 
HSwMS Sjöormen was renamed RSS Centurion and Singapore reacquired the boat on 28 May 1999. She was commissioned on 26 June 2004 after a major refit. After 11 years in the Republic of Singapore Navy, she was decommissioned on 11 March 2015 and scrapped. Her fin and sail were preserved as a memorial at the Republic of Singapore Navy Museum.

Gallery

References

Sjöormen-class submarines
Ships built in Malmö
1967 ships
Challenger-class submarines
Republic of Singapore Navy